Buckerell is a small village and civil parish in the East Devon district of Devon, England. The village is about 2.5 miles west of the nearest town, Honiton. In the 2001 census a population of 270 was recorded for the parish, which is surrounded clockwise from the north by the parishes of Awliscombe, Honiton, Gittisham, Feniton and Payhembury.

History
The Church of St Mary and St Giles dates from the 13th or 14th century and has been designates as a Grade II* listed building. There is a richly-carved Chancel screen. There is a statue of Britannia by John Bacon, in memory of Admiral Samuel Graves and his wife.

References

External links

Buckerell community page
Buckerell at GENUKI

Villages in Devon